The Good Lord Bird is a 2013 novel by James McBride about Henry Shackleford, an enslaved person, who unites with John Brown in Brown's abolitionist mission. The novel won the National Book Award for Fiction in 2013 and received generally positive reviews from critics.

Plot
The memoirs of Henry Shackleford, an enslaved person in Kansas during the Bleeding Kansas era, are discovered in a Delaware church. Henry, nicknamed "Little Onion" for eating a particularly rancid onion, accidentally encounters abolitionist John Brown in a tavern. Brown mistakes Henry for a girl and gives him a dress to wear; Shackleford wears a dress for much of the novel. The two join together, and Henry narrates his encounters with Frederick Douglass, Harriet Tubman, and the events at John Brown's raid on Harpers Ferry. The book is narrated in the first person through Henry.

Reception
The novel received generally positive reviews from critics, with several reviewers comparing it to Adventures of Huckleberry Finn (1884). In a review for the Los Angeles Times, Héctor Tobar called the novel "laugh-out-loud funny and filled with many wonderfully bizarre images", but noted the lack of humanity in comparison to Huckleberry Finn or Middle Passage (1990). Tobar went on to say "those looking for verisimilitude or gravitas in their historical fiction might want to avoid The Good Lord Bird." Laura Miller of Salon drew comparisons between the novel and Huckleberry Finn, specifically comparing the moral awakening of Finn to the journey of Henry; writer Christine Brunkhorst notes how Onion and Finn both encounter "drunken rebels, brutal slave owners, spineless men, clairvoyant women, crooked judges and some brave and principled people." In a review for the San Francisco Chronicle, novelist Amity Gaige praised McBride's "reimagining" of Brown's raid on Harpers Ferry and added that he "[managed] to novelize real historical events without dreary prostrations to the act".

The novel won the National Book Award for Fiction in 2013. National Book Award judges called McBride "a voice as comic and original as any we have heard since Mark Twain." McBride did not prepare an acceptance speech, as he thought he would not win, and was described as "clearly stunned" upon receiving the award.

Adaptation

Ethan Hawke and Jason Blum adapted the book for a television show, which premiered on October 4, 2020 on Showtime.

References

Further reading
 

2013 American novels
Cultural depictions of John Brown (abolitionist)
Cultural depictions of Harriet Tubman
Books about Frederick Douglass
National Book Award for Fiction winning works
Riverhead Books books
American novels adapted into television shows